The Pacific geoduck (Panopea generosa) is a species of very large saltwater clam in the family Hiatellidae. The common name is derived from the Lushootseed (Nisqually) word .

The geoduck is native to the coastal waters of the eastern North Pacific Ocean from Alaska to Baja California. The geoduck is the largest burrowing clam in the world. It is also one of the longest-living animals of any type, with a typical lifespan of 140 years; the oldest has been recorded at 179 years old. The precise longevity of geoducks can be determined from annual rings deposited in the shell which can be assigned to calendar years of formation through crossdating. These annual rings also serve as an archive of past marine variability.

Etymology

The name geoduck is derived from a Lushootseed (Nisqually) word , either a word composed of a first element of unknown meaning and  meaning "genitals" (referring to the shape of the clam), or a phrase meaning "dig deep", or perhaps both, as a double entendre. It is sometimes known as a mud duck, king clam or, when translated literally from Chinese, an elephant-trunk clam. A group of geoducks is called a "bag".

Between 1983 and 2010, the scientific name of this clam was confused with that of an extinct clam, Panopea abrupta (Conrad, 1849), in scientific literature.

Biology

A related species, Panopea zelandica, is found in New Zealand and has been harvested commercially since 1989. The largest quantities have come from Golden Bay in the South Island where  were harvested in one year. There is a growing concern over the increase of parasites in the Puget Sound population of geoduck. Whether these microsporidium-like parasitic species were introduced by commercial farming is being studied by Sea Grant. Research to date does indicate their presence.

The oldest recorded specimen was 179 years old, but individuals usually live up to 140 years. A geoduck sucks water containing plankton down through its long siphon, filters this for food and ejects its refuse out through a separate hole in the siphon. Adult geoducks have few natural predators, which may also contribute to their longevity. In Alaska, sea otters and dogfish have proved capable of dislodging geoducks; starfish also attack and feed on the exposed geoduck siphon.

Geoducks are broadcast spawners. A female geoduck produces about 5 billion eggs in her century-long lifespan. However, due to a low rate of recruitment and a high rate of mortality for geoduck eggs, larvae, and post-settled juveniles, populations are slow to rebound. In the Puget Sound, studies indicate that the recovery time for a harvested tract is 39 years.

Biomass densities in Southeast Alaska are estimated by divers, then inflated by twenty percent to account for geoducks not visible at the time of survey. This estimate is used to predict the two percent allowed for commercial harvesting.

Industry

The world's first geoduck fishery was created in 1970, but demand for the half-forgotten clam was low at first due to its texture. , these clams sell in China for over US.

The geoduck's high market value has created an $80-million industry, with harvesting occurring in the US states of Alaska, Washington, and Oregon and the Canadian province of British Columbia. It is one of the most closely regulated fisheries in both countries. In Washington, Department of Natural Resources staff are on the water continually monitoring harvests to ensure revenues are received, and the same is true in Canada where the Underwater Harvesters' Association manages the Canadian Fishery in conjunction with Canada's Department of Fisheries and Oceans. The Washington State Department of Health tests water and flesh to assure clams are not filtering and holding pollutants, an ongoing problem. With the rise in price has come the inevitable problem with poaching, and with it the possibility some could be harvested from unsafe areas.

, advances in the testing system for contaminated clams have allowed geoduck harvesters to deliver live clams more consistently. The new testing system determines the viability of clams from tested beds before the harvesters fish the area. Previous methods tested clams after harvest. This advancement has meant that 90 percent of clams were delivered live to market in 2007. In 2001, only 10 percent were live. Because geoduck have a much higher market value live, an additional , this development has helped to stimulate the burgeoning industry.

The COVID-19 pandemic disrupted the geoduck industry. Given the near-shutdown of restaurants and seafood markets across the country, demand for live geoducks plummeted.

Environmental impact
Geoduck farming grow-out and harvest practices are controversial, and have created conflicts with shoreline property owners, and concerns from nongovernmental organizations. However, the Environmental Defense Fund has found that bivalves (oysters, mussels, and clams) are beneficial to the marine environment. The water must be certifiably clean to plant geoducks commercially. Regulation was mandated in 2007. Studies have been funded to determine short- and long-term environmental and genetic impacts. In southern Puget Sound, the effect of geoduck farming on large mobile animals is ambiguous. A 2004 draft biological assessment, commissioned by three of the largest commercial shellfish companies in the Puget Sound region, identified no long-term effects of geoduck farming on threatened or endangered species.

Culinary uses
The large, meaty siphon is prized for its savory flavor and crunchy texture. Geoduck is regarded by some as an aphrodisiac because of its phallic shape. It is very popular in China, where it is considered a delicacy, mostly eaten cooked in a fondue-style Chinese hot pot. In Korean cuisine, geoducks are eaten raw with spicy chili sauce, sautéed, or in soups and stews. In Japan, geoduck is prepared as raw sashimi, dipped in soy sauce and wasabi. It is considered to have a texture similar to an ark shell (known in Japanese as ).  is sometimes translated into English as "giant clam", and it is distinguished from  sushi, which is made from Tridacna gigas.

Chinese import ban
In December 2013, China imposed a ban on geoduck and other "double-shell aquatic animals"—such as clams, oysters, mussels, and scallops—that were imported from the west coast of the United States. Chinese officials found in an Alaskan shipment high levels of saxitoxin, a natural product that certain shellfish can accumulate, which when eaten by humans, can cause paralytic shellfish poisoning resulting in severe illness or even death. A shipment from Washington state was high in arsenic. The ban was in place for less than 6 months, ending in May 2014.

Popular culture 
Evergreen State College in Olympia, Washington, has a geoduck as its mascot  named Speedy.

Geoducks have also earned some internet infamy due to the phallic appearance of their siphons.

References

External links

 Man and Mollusc—Geoduck facts
 Geoduck.org; Underwater Harvester's Association
 Geoduck.org: UHA—BC Seafood Alliance,
 The Evergreen State College's Geoducks Page
 Fisheries and Oceans Canada—Geoduck clam (Panopea abrupta)—Anatomy, Histology, Development, Pathology, Parasites, and Symbionts.
 "Duckumentary" film Home Page: "3 Feet Under—Digging Deep for the Geoduck Clam"
 Geoduck cooking Recipes

Clams
Hiatellidae
Marine molluscs of North America
Molluscs of the Pacific Ocean
Molluscs of the United States
Western North American coastal fauna
Commercial molluscs
Japanese seafood
Seafood in Native American cuisine
Washington (state) culture
Bivalves described in 1850
Taxa named by Augustus Addison Gould